The 2 Bears are a British musical duo formed in 2009 composed of Joe Goddard (of electronic band Hot Chip) and Raf Rundell (previously of 1965 Records). The duo produces original material amalgamating various styles including , house and soul and also host a radio show on Ministry of Sound Radio entitled Follow the Bears. Critics offer various descriptions of The 2 Bears' sound including "pop-hip-house"  "liquid-bmore-house-step" and "rave-garage". The duo have produced remixes for several established artists including Santigold, Metronomy, Toddla T and the View.

History
Raf Rundell, a former press officer, and Joe Goddard, one fifth of electronic music band Hot Chip, met while working together at the Greco-Roman soundsystem parties. Joe has told how the band originated from the suggestion of a friend who proposed that he, Rundell and Joe Mount (from the band Metronomy) form a band called 'The 3 Bears'. The band ultimately formed as a two piece without Joe Mount.

During their formative studio sessions Rundell and Goddard created the tracks "Mercy Time" and "Be Strong", which went on to appear on their first EP Follow The Bears, released by Southern Fried Records in early 2010. Follow The Bears was supported by a subsequent remix EP featuring contributions from Derrick Carter and Supabeatz. The 2 Bears went on to release a further two EPs on Southern Fried Records, Curious Nature EP in the latter part of 2010 and Bearhug EP in early 2011. Both were accompanied by further remix EPs with contributors including Maxxi Soundsystem and Midland.

The 2 Bears first complete album Be Strong was released on 29 January 2012 and was preceded by the single "Work" on 2 January. The single was included on the XFM playlist. They also made a mix album, 2 Bears 1 Love which featured Wiley, Toddla T, and remixes from the 2 Bears.
They also announced a second LP titled The Night is Young, to be released in October 2014 on Southern Fried Records.

Discography

Albums

Remix albums

Extended plays

Singles

Notes

References

External links 
 
 Interview in Observer, 18 December 2011

English electronic music duos
Musical groups established in 2009
2009 establishments in the United Kingdom
Musical groups from London
Electronic dance music duos
Male musical duos
DFA Records artists